The 2020 Go Bowling 250 was the 24th stock car race of the 2020 NASCAR Xfinity Series season, and the 39th iteration of the event. The race was held on Friday, September 11, 2020 in Richmond, Virginia at Richmond Raceway, a  permanent D-shaped asphalt racetrack. The race took the scheduled 250 laps to complete. At race's end, Justin Allgaier of JR Motorsports would win his 13th NASCAR Xfinity Series race of his career and the 2nd of the season. To fill out the podium, Justin Haley of Kaulig Racing and Kyle Busch of Kyle Busch Motorsports would finish 2nd and 3rd, respectively.

Background 
Richmond Raceway is a 3/4-mile (1.2 km), D-shaped, asphalt race track located just outside Richmond, Virginia in Henrico County. It hosts the NASCAR Cup Series and Xfinity Series. Known as "America's premier short track", it formerly hosted an IndyCar Series race and two USAC sprint car races.

Entry list

Starting lineup 
The starting lineup was determined by a metric qualifying system based on the results and fastest lap of the previous race, the 2020 Sport Clips Haircuts VFW 200 and owner's points. As a result, Ross Chastain of Kaulig Racing won the pole.

Race results 
Stage 1 Laps: 75

Stage 2 Laps: 75

Stage 3 Laps: 100

References 

2020 NASCAR Xfinity Series
NASCAR races at Richmond Raceway
September 2020 sports events in the United States
2020 in sports in Virginia